Jerry Michalski is an American technology consultant. He is the former managing editor of Release 1.0, a technology newsletter. He is the founder of Sociate.com and ReX (Relationship Economy eXpedition).

Education
Jerry Michalski graduated from the University of California, Irvine with a bachelor of arts degree in economics. He received a master in business administration from the Wharton School of the University of Pennsylvania.

Career
Michalski served as the managing editor of Release 1.0, the newsletter published, and originally written and edited solely by Esther Dyson.

Michalski is the founder of Sociate.com. He is also the founder of ReX (Relationship Economy eXpedition). He has given lectures about the "economy of relationships" in front of think tanks like the Institute for the Future, where he argued that the thriving economies of the future will rest upon relationships.

Michalski is considered to be one of the Digerati.

Boards
Michalski is a board member of Zev Shapiro's organization TurnUp

References

Living people
University of California, Irvine alumni
Wharton School of the University of Pennsylvania alumni
American editors
Year of birth missing (living people)